Vestergaard is a company headquartered in Lausanne, Switzerland that manufactures public health tools for people in developing countries. Founded as Vestergaard Frandsen in 1957 as a uniform maker, the company evolved into a social enterprise making products for humanitarian aid in the 1990s. It is now best known for inventing the LifeStraw water filter and the PermaNet mosquito net.

History
Vestergaard was founded in 1957 by Kaj Vestergaard Frandsen, a former farmer and the grandfather of current owner Mikkel Vestergaard Frandsen. Kaj founded the company with a friend before doing it alone. The company made linings for jackets and uniforms. Kaj's son Torben took over in 1970. Production was first moved to Ireland and then to Poland in 1989.

In 1990, Torben bought up 1 million yards of Swedish army surplus fabric used for uniforms, and turned it into blankets for aid organizations. That was the beginning of a change in focus of the company that continued after Mikkel was persuaded to join the company by his father in 1993. Mikkel had worked in Lagos from the age of 19 running a truck company, which "ignited his passion for Africa." He left Nigeria following a military coup and returned to Denmark to work with his father. In 1997 Torben and Mikkel agreed to split the company into separate female uniform and humanitarian textiles businesses, and then Mikkel bought out his father and stopped producing uniforms.

Under Mikkel's leadership the company focused on the business model of humanitarian entrepreneurship, product innovation that improves lives of people and makes a profit.

In 1996, the company began supplying Guinea worm filters to The Carter Center. PermaNet bed nets were launched in 1999, LifeStraw was introduced in 2005 and ZeroFly entered the market in 2012. Those early products defined Vestergaard's three focus areas aligned with the Sustainable Development Goals: public health, water and food security.

The company moved headquarters from Kolding to Lausanne in 2005–6, which it said was to better attract specialist employees and due to the presence of international organizations such as UN agencies and the Red Cross in Switzerland. In 2010, the company was around 20 times the size of when Mikkel joined it. Vestergaard has continued to work on product innovations for vector borne illnesses, water borne illnesses and food security. In 2007, due to the increase in insecticide resistant mosquitoes, a new bednet was developed as a combination net with increased efficacy against mosquitoes resistant to insecticides. Vestergaard has been a member of the UN Global Compact since 2008 and initiated, then participated in the Bed Net Industry Dialogue hosted by the Global Business Coalition in 2009. In 2012, Vestergaard developed IR Mapper, an online tool for mapping insecticide resistance.

Mikkel Vestergaard Frandsen stepped down as CEO in January 2020 and was replaced by Michael Joos.

Products
The company has several "disease control textiles" products designed as health interventions for developing countries, including the LifeStraw water filtration device to prevent waterborne disease, and the PermaNet, a mosquito net impregnated with the long-lasting insecticide deltamethrin to prevent malaria. The company also produces ZeroFly, which is a defence against insect pests for livestock and crop protection. Vestergaard also initiates programs to enhance delivery of its products: the company bundles LifeStraw and PermaNet together into a CarePack of preventive health tools to encourage people to get tested for HIV; LifeStraw has been distributed as part of the LifeStraw Carbon for Water program, where nearly 900,000 water purifiers were distributed in Kenya through funding provided by carbon offsets. In 2014, Lifestraw launched a Give Back program designed to provide one school child in a developing country safe drinking water for an entire school year. The program is funded by retail sales in North America or Europe.

 LifeStraw. A water filter designed to be used by one person to filter water for drinking. It filters a maximum of 1000 litres of water, enough for one person for one year. It removes almost all of waterborne bacteria and parasites. In addition to the classic LifeStraw, the manufacturer also produces other styles on the LifeStraw product: the LifeStraw Family, a larger unit designed for family use, and the LifeStraw Go Water Bottle, which incorporates a LifeStraw filter into a 22-ounce bpa-free sports water bottle.
 PermaNet. Vestergaard is the largest producer of insecticide-treated bed nets and has distributed over half a billion nets worldwide.
 ZeroFly. ZeroFly products are insecticide-treated materials, including tarpaulins and storage bags.

Recognition
The company was named as a Fast Company Top 50 company in 2007. The company won The Economist’s Social and Economic Innovation Award in 2009.

References

External links
Official website

Manufacturing companies established in 1957
Textile companies of Switzerland
Companies based in Lausanne
Appropriate technology organizations
Swiss companies established in 1957